Fairbank Island is an island located in Chippewa County, Michigan, United States.

References

Islands of Chippewa County, Michigan